Pavan Ramdya (born 1979) is an American neuroscientist and bioengineer. His research centers on understanding the neuromechanical control of behavior and its application to robotics and artificial intelligence in neurosciences. He holds the Firmenich Next Generation Chair in neuroscience and bioengineering at EPFL (École Polytechnique Fédérale de Lausanne), and is head of the Neuroengineering Laboratory at EPFL's School of Life Sciences.

Career 
Ramdya studied neuroscience first at Drew University, where he received his bachelor's degree with honors (summa cum laude, Phi Beta Kappa) in 2001. He continued his studies at Harvard University and in 2009 received a PhD for his work in the group of Florian Engert. He then went on to perform postdoctoral work in neurogenetics and robotics in the laboratories of Richard Benton at University of Lausanne (UNIL) and Dario Floreano at EPFL, respectively. There he studied locomotor control and collective behavior in Drosophila melanogaster. In 2015, he moved to the California Institute of Technology to work as a visiting postdoctoral fellow with Michael Dickinson where he developed a means for imaging motor circuit activity in behaving Drosophila.

Since 2017 he has been an assistant professor for neuroscience at EPFL, and head of the Neuroengineering Laboratory located at both the Brain Mind Institute and at the Institute of Bioengineering of EPFL's School of Life Sciences.

Research 
Ramdya's research is focused on reverse-engineering biological neuromechanical control to inspire the development of artificial systems that can mimic the flexibility and agility of animal behaviors. Specifically, he studies limb-dependent behaviors in Drosophila melanogaster, employing an interdisciplinary approach which draws on genetic manipulations, neural and behavioral recordings, and physics-based neural network models and simulations.

His research was featured in National Geographic, IEEE Spectrum, Nature, Quanta Magazine, and Le Monde.

Distinctions 
He is a member of the FENS-Kavli Network of Excellence. He has been the recipient of HFSP Long-term and Career Development Awards, and the UNIL Biology and Medicine, Young Investigator Award in Basic Science. In 2019, he was granted the SNSF Eccellenza Grant.

Selected works

References

External links 
 
 Publication listed on Publons
 Website of the Neuroengineering Laboratory

1979 births
Living people
Drew University alumni
Harvard University alumni
University of Lausanne alumni
Academic staff of the École Polytechnique Fédérale de Lausanne
American neuroscientists
American bioengineers